The AC Cobra, sold in the United States as the Shelby Cobra and AC Shelby Cobra, is a sports car manufactured by British company AC Cars, with a Ford V8 engine. It was produced intermittently in both the United Kingdom and later the United States since 1962.

History and development 
Like many British manufacturers, AC Cars had been using the Bristol straight-6 engine in its small-volume production, including its AC Ace two-seater roadster.  This had a hand-built body with a steel tube frame, and aluminium body panels that were made using English wheeling machines. The engine was a pre-World War II design by BMW which by the 1960s was considered dated. In 1961 Bristol decided to cease production of its engine.

In September 1961, American retired race car driver and automotive designer Carroll Shelby wrote to AC asking if they would build him a car modified to accept a V8 engine. Bristol engines for the AC Ace two-seater sports car had recently been discontinued so AC agreed, provided a suitable engine could be found. Shelby went to Chevrolet to see if they would provide him with engines, but not wanting to add competition to the Corvette, Chevrolet declined. However, Ford wanted a car that could compete with the Corvette and they happened to have a brand new engine which could be used in this endeavor: the Windsor  engine – a new lightweight, thin-wall cast small-block V8. Ford provided Shelby with two engines.

AC Ace 3.6 
In January 1962 mechanics at AC Cars in Thames Ditton, Surrey designed the "AC Ace 3.6" prototype with chassis number CSX2000.

AC had already made most of the modifications needed for the small-block V8 when they installed the  inline 6 Ford Zephyr engine, including the extensive rework of the AC Ace's front end bodywork. The only modification of the front end of the first Cobra from that of the "AC Ace 2.6" was the steering box, which had to be moved outward to clear the wider V8 engine.

The most important modification was the fitting of a stronger rear differential to handle the increased engine power. A Salisbury 4HU unit with inboard disc brakes to reduce unsprung weight was chosen instead of the old E.N.V. unit. It was the same unit used on the Jaguar E-Type.

Shelby's team paired this engine along with a transmission into CSX2000, in less than eight hours at Dean Moon's shop in Santa Fe Springs, California, and began road-testing.

Production 
(CSX/CS 2001–2602)

A few changes were made to the production version:
 The inboard brakes were moved outboard to reduce cost.
 The fuel tank filler was relocated from the fender to the center of the trunk. The trunk lid had to be shortened to accommodate this change.

AC exported completed, painted, and trimmed cars (less engine and gearbox) to Shelby who then finished the cars in his workshop in Los Angeles by installing the engine and gearbox and correcting any bodywork flaws caused by the car's passage by sea. A small number of cars were also completed on the East Coast of the US by Ed Hugus in Pennsylvania, including the first production car; CSX2001.

The remaining 51 Mk1 models were fitted with a larger version of the Windsor Ford engine, the  V8.

In late 1962, Alan Turner, AC's chief engineer, completed a major design change of the car's front end to accommodate rack and pinion steering while still using transverse leaf spring suspension (with the leaf spring doubling as the upper suspension link). The new car entered production in early 1963 and was designated Mark II. The steering rack was borrowed from the MGB while the new steering column came from the VW Beetle. About 528 Mark II Cobras were produced from 1963 to the summer of 1965 (the last US-bound Mark II was produced in November 1964).

European model 
(COB/COX 6001–6062)

In 1963 to keep production focused on producing cars for Shelby American Inc., the Ruddspeed Ace was discontinued. To supply cars to the European market, AC began to market and sell the Cobra in Europe. Advertisements from the time state that the Cobra was designed to meet the requirements of Shelby American Inc.

390 Big Block Cobra 

Unfortunately, the car was not able to receive the development it needed, as resources were aimed at taking the crown from Ferrari in the GT class. Ken Miles drove and raced the FE-powered Mark II at Sebring and pronounced the car virtually undrivable, naming it "The Turd". It failed to finish with the engine expiring due to damper failure.

CSX2196 was revised for the showdown at Nassau which allowed a more relaxed class division of racing. This allowed the Cobras to run with a prototype Ford GT40, GM Grand Sport Corvettes and a Lola Mk6. An aluminium  engine was used. By the end of the first lap, the Cobra had a lead of the length of the start-finish straight. However, the car failed to finish due to brake problems.

Cobra 427 

A new chassis was required, developed, and designated Mark III. The new car was designed in cooperation with Ford in Detroit. The new car also had wide fenders and a larger radiator opening.

Competition models (CSX/CSB 3001–3100)

Cobra Mark III production began on 1 January 1965; two prototypes had been sent to the United States in October 1964. Cars were sent to the US as unpainted rolling chassis, and they were finished in Shelby's workshop.

Unfortunately, The MK III missed homologation for the 1965 racing season and was not raced by the Shelby team. Only 56 of the 100 planned cars were produced. Of those, 31 unsold competition models were detuned and fitted with windscreens for street use. Called S/C for semi-competition, an original example can currently sell for US$1.5 million, making it one of the most valuable Cobra variants.

Production models (CSX/CSB 3101–3360)

Some Cobra 427s were fitted with Ford's  engine, a long stroke, smaller bore, lower cost engine, intended for road use rather than racing. The AC Cobra was a financial failure that led Ford and Carroll Shelby to discontinue importing cars from England in 1967.

AC 289 Sports 
(COB/COX 6101–6132)

AC Cars kept producing the coil-spring AC Roadster with narrow fenders and a small block Ford 289. It was built and sold in Europe until late 1969.

Packages

Dragon Snake
Shelby offered a drag package, known as the Dragon Snake, which won several NHRA National events with Bruce Larson or Ed Hedrick at the wheel of CSX2093.

Only six 289 Dragon Snake Cobras were produced by the factory: "2019", "2357" as factory team cars, and "2248", "2416", "2427", "2472" as private team cars. One 427 Dragon Snake, 3198, was produced.

Cobras were also prepared by customers using the drag package. Examples include: "2075", "2093", "2109", "2353", and 3159 "King Cobra."

Slalom Snake

Designed for auto-cross events, only two examples were produced, the CSX2522 "Slalom Special", and the CSX2537 "Slalom Snake". Both had white exterior paint (with red racing strings) and red leather interiors.

Equipped almost identically to CSX2522, the second example had aluminum valve covers, a tuned air cleaner, a Smiths heater, seat belts, front and rear brake cooling ducts, a hood scoop, brake cooling scoops, side exhausts and a painted roll bar (2522's roll bar was chromed). Suspension options included Koni shock absorbers, front and rear anti-sway bars, unpolished six-inch magnesium pin-drive wheels, and Goodyear Blue Streak Sports Car Special tires.

Super Snake

In 1966, CSX 3015 S/C was selected and converted into a special model called the Supersnake the "Cobra to End All Cobras." Originally part of a European promotional tour before its conversion. This conversion called for making the original racing model street legal with mufflers, a windshield and bumpers amongst other modifications. But some things were not modified, including the racing rear end, brakes and headers. The most notable modification is the addition of Twin Paxton Superchargers, TPS.

Shelby crafted a second model, CSX 3303, from a street version. CSX 3303 was given to comedian Bill Cosby, his close friend. When Cosby attempted to drive CSX3303, he found that it was very difficult to keep under control; he later recounted the experience on his 1968 stand-up comedy album 200 M.P.H.. Cosby gave the car back to Shelby, who then shipped it out to one of his company's dealers in San Francisco, S&C Ford on Van Ness Avenue. S&C Ford then sold it to customer Tony Maxey. Maxey, suffering the same issues as Cosby did with the car, had his throttle stick while leaving a traffic stop, lost control and drove it off a cliff, landing in the Pacific Ocean waters.

Shelby used his CSX 3015 as a personal car over the years, sometimes entering it into local races like the Turismos Visitadores Cannonball-Run race in Nevada, where he was "waking [up] whole towns, blowing out windows, throwing belts and catching fire a couple of times, but finishing." CSX3015 was auctioned on 22 January 2007, at the Barrett-Jackson Collector Car Event in Scottsdale, Arizona, for $5 million plus commission (£2.8 million), a record for a vehicle made in the U.S.

Adaptations 
(CF/CFX 01–80)

AC also produced the AC 428 Frua on a stretched Cobra 427 MK III coil spring chassis. The steel body was designed and built by Pietro Frua until 1973.

(EF/EFX 501–508)

The American Electric Car Company used an even further modified chassis for their vehicles.

GHIA SPYDER

(CSX 5001–5002)

One  prototype chassis (CSX 3063) was shipped to Ghia in Italy in 1965 for a body styling exercise. This vehicle was first displayed during a European car show with a Cobra license tag. An article about the car was written up in the Winter 65/66 edition of "Style Quarterly" magazine. Shelby American internal production records show that the car was shipped to Shelby American for Evaluation and review. AC Cars Ltd internal production records show that Shelby American placed an order for two 96-inch chassis (CSX 5001–5002) in 1966. AC labeled these chassis as "GHIA CONVERTIBLE" in their factory ledger.

FORD XD COBRA

(CSX 3001)

Shelby American internal production records show that the car was shipped to Shelby American for evaluation and review in early 1966. The vehicle was returned to Ford and now resides in the Detroit Historical Museum.

AutoKraft 
Autokraft manufactured an AC 289 continuation car called the Autokraft Mk IV, basically a Mk III with a  Ford V8 and Borg Warner T5 Transmission. The Mk IV also received an independent suspension.

While the Lightweight did not meet US federal regulations, the Mk IV did, and 480 cars of all versions were built until 1996.

AC Car Group 
In 1996 the company was purchased by Pride Automotive. Two new 'Cobra' style cars were launched in 1997, the 'Superblower', an aluminium-bodied car with a supercharged  Ford V8 providing  and the cheaper 'Carbon Road Series' (CRS) with a carbonfibre body and a  version of the Ford V8 engine. 22 Superblowers and 37 CRSs were built between 1997 and 2001.

In 1999, a limited edition run of 25 289 FIA Cobras were planned. Only 1 example was manufacturered, chassis number COB 1001.

A further variant, 'the 212 S/C' with a   twin-turbocharged Lotus V8 engine was introduced in 2000, but only two examples were built.

In 2001, the company relocated its factory to Frimley, Surrey. By August 2002, the company was in a financial low and briefly acquired by Private Corp, who closed operations in October 2003. Only two models were produced, a FIA 289 (COX 2610), and a 427 Cobra (COX 3361). The cars were intended to be sold in the US market, through a new company, AC Cars USA, in Florida. Both cars were numbered following where the original ledger entries left off during the 1960s.

AC Motor Holdings Ltd 
On 8 July 2002, a new company was formed in Malta named AC Motor Holdings and was responsible for the branding of the company.

In late 2003, the Frimley factory was under the control of AC Motor Holdings.

On 4 December 2003, Shelby and AC announced a co-production of the CSX1000 and CSX 7500 series. Only 14 CSX1000, and 2 CSX 7500 cars were built by 2007.

Between 2004 and 2007, AC Motor Holdings produced the AC Mk V in their Malta factory. However, only 3 right-hand drive and 2 left-hand drive carbon-fibre AC Mk Vs powered by   Ford V8 engines were built before the Maltese operation closed.

Acedes Holdings Llc 
On 20 April 2008, AC announced its Heritage Series, the UK operations were granted to Brooklands Motor Company, dba AC Heritage. The US operations were granted to AC AutoKraft, Llc, of Michigan.

Both companies are licensed to produce traditional aluminum-body models: Ruddspeed, 289, and 427 continuation Aces and Cobras.

In 2009, AC licensed Gullwing GmbH in Germany, dba AC-Automotive, to produce the AC MK VI, with an aluminium coated composite body and powered by a   LS3 Chevrolet engine, or a  supercharged version.

In 2012, the AC Mrk II Classic was released.  Available in either aluminum or fiberglass bodies.

In 2017, the AC Mrk1 260 Legacy edition was released in a limited production of nine cars. Also released was the AC 378 a newer composite body version of the Cobra.

Shelby Daytona Coupé 

 
In an effort to improve top speed along the legendary Mulsanne Straight at the 24 Hours of Le Mans race, a number of enclosed, coupé variations were constructed using the leafspring chassis and running gear of the AC/Shelby Cobra Mark II. The most famous and numerous of these were the official works Shelby Daytona Cobra Coupés. Six were constructed, each being subtly different from the rest.

AC Cars also produced a Le Mans coupé. The car was a one-off and was nearly destroyed after a high-speed tyre blow-out at the 1964 Le Mans race. The car was qualified conservatively second in GT. The race started well with the AC, chassis number A98, maintaining its position in the top two in GT and even leading the class for a time. This was not to last as an act of sabotage (newspaper in the fuel tank) began to block the fuel filter. The car lost time until this was diagnosed and cleaned out. The car proceeded on at the predetermined conservative lap time and for the next stint remained trouble free. The car was able to match the Shelby Daytona's speed despite running a higher differential ratio (2.88 instead of 3.07) and a lower state of engine tune for reliability ( instead of the Daytona's ).

The Willment race team became interested in Shelby's Cobra-based coupé and inquired on purchasing one. Shelby turned down the offer, but supplied the drawings to Willment. Dubbed the Willment Cobra Coupé, this car was fully built by the JWA racing team and numbered 2131 on the frame.

427 Super Coupé 

A prototype (CSX 3027) was to become 427 Coupé, but since the focus was shifted towards the GT program, this project received little attention. The bodywork and chassis were soon scrapped.

Two further chassis were ordered number CSX 3054 and CSX 3055. This project was also abandoned with just CSX 3054 receiving a body. CSX 3055 was sold to the Willment Race Team and was fitted with a Fiat body designed by Ghia.

Counterfeit Cobras 
In 1993, the Los Angeles Times exposed a scheme by Shelby to counterfeit his own cars. With the price of an original 427 c.i. Cobra skyrocketing, Shelby had requested the California Department of Motor Vehicles (the government agency responsible for titling vehicles and issuing operator permits) to issue 43 duplicate titles for vehicles that did not officially exist in company records. A letter from AC Cars confirmed the fact that the chassis numbers for which Shelby had obtained titles were never manufactured, at least not by AC Cars. Only 55 427 c.i. Cobras had been originally produced out of a block of serial numbers reserved for 100 vehicles. Shelby had taken advantage of a loophole in the California system that allowed one to obtain a duplicate title for a vehicle with only a written declaration, without the vehicle identification number appearing in the DMV's database or the declarant ever presenting an actual vehicle for inspection. Shelby admitted that the chassis had been manufactured in 1991 and 1992 by McCluskey Ltd, an engineering firm in Torrance, California, and were not original AC chassis, however Shelby denied having misled anyone and said he was a victim of a campaign by Brian Angliss, a British competitor, who owned AC at the time and was also building Cobras from the original tooling and wished to enhance his sales by smearing Shelby's car.

Continuation Cars 

Since the late 1980s onwards, various companies have built what are known in the hobby as "Continuation Cars".

Shelby authorized continuations of the original AC-built Cobra series. Produced in Las Vegas, Nevada, these cars retain the general style and appearance of their original 1960s ancestors, but are fitted with modern amenities. The initial version for continuation was a 427 S/C model which was represented in the CSX4000 series. This was meant to continue where the last 427 S/C production left off, at approximately serial number CSX3360 in the 1960s.

The initial CSX4000 series cars were completed from the chassis built by Mike McCluskey with NOS and reconditioned parts. Based in Torrance, Calif., McCluskey had been Shelby’s personal mechanic since the 1960s and was a well-established restorer and fabricator. Given the value of the vehicle many "extra" cars have appeared over the years, even some sharing the same chassis number. Gradually as the vintage parts supply ran low, newly constructed frames and body panels were obtained from a variety of suppliers. The production of chassis numbers CSX4001 to CSX4999 took roughly 20 years and many different business relationships to complete.

In 2009, CSX4999 was produced, concluding the 4000 series. Production has continued with the CSX6000 serial numbers, featuring "coil over" suspension.

The 289 FIA "leaf spring" race version of the car is reproduced as CSX7000, and the original "slab side" leaf spring street car is the CSX8000 series. The Daytona Coupé is reproduced as the CSX 9000 series.

To date most continuations are produced in fiberglass, with some ordering cars with aluminium or carbon-fibre bodywork.

In 2004, at the North American International Auto Show in Detroit, Ford unveiled a concept for a modernized AC Cobra. The Ford Shelby Cobra Concept was a continuation of Ford's effort to bring back the retro sports cars that had been successful in the 1960s, including the Ford GT40 and the fifth generation Ford Mustang.

In 2014, Shelby American announced a limited edition production of 50 cars for the 50th anniversary of the original 427 Shelby Cobra.

During the continuation period, Kirkham Motorsports were contracted by Shelby to produce rolling Cobra body/chassis units but this did not end amicably. Pete Brock said in a Hot Rod magazine interview "Like the Kirkhams, even when they were supplying most of Shelby’s Cobra parts. Shelby would go to them and say he would buy their entire year’s worth of production and sign a contract. They called me and asked if they should do it and I said, "As long as you get the money up front, but if you let a car out the door, you’ll lose money." Shelby paid that way for two years and then finally [Kirkhams] got a great big order and Shelby's truck driver said he forgot to bring the check. He went back with a bunch of cars on the transporter and Shelby told them he wasn't going to pay them—that they owed it to him. That almost put [Kirkhams] out of business."

See also 
 Bill Thomas Cheetah, the 1963-started, Chevrolet Corvette-based private-venture challenger to the Cobra
 James Heffel's Shelby Cobra converted to hydrogen
The Snake and the Stallion
 Timeline of most powerful production cars

References

External links 

 
 
 Shelby Automobiles Inc., Las Vegas, Nevada
  thecobraferrariwars.com
 AC Cars website
 AC Heritage website
 AC Cobra 427 (1969) Exterior and Interior in 3D 4K UHD

1960s cars
Cobra
Group 4 (racing) cars
Rear-wheel-drive vehicles
Roadsters
Cobra